Bambi's Childhood is a 1985 Soviet family film directed by Natalya Bondarchuk.

Plot 
The film tells about a deer named Bambi, who, from birth, learns to understand the mysterious forest world. Life seems beautiful to him, until suddenly his mother dies.

Cast 
 Ivan Burlyaev as Bambi (child)
 Nikolay Burlyaev as Bambi (adolescent)
 Natalya Bondarchuk as Bambi's mother
 Maris Liepa as Bambi's father
 Yekaterina Lychyova as Falina (child) (as Katya Lychyova)
 Galina Belyaeva as Falina (adolescent)
 Maksim Shalnov as Gobo
 Lev Durov as Eagle Owl
 Aivars Leimanis as Karus
 Inna Makarova as Netla

References

External links 
 

1985 films
1980s Russian-language films
Soviet children's films
Films based on works by Felix Salten
Films set in forests
Bambi
Films about deer and moose
Films based on Austrian novels